A Haunting At Silver Falls is a 2013 American horror film directed by Brett Donowho. The film was released on May 28, 2013 and stars Alix Elizabeth Gitter as a young woman that must uncover the true murderer of a heinous crime before she becomes a victim herself. It is very loosely based upon a true story Donowho read about two murdered twins.

Plot
The movie starts with a young girl running through a dark wood from a shadowy figure. The scene becomes bleak as a severed hand is seen next to the girl's dead body as her body is dragged away. On the hand is a silver ring.

Jordan (Alix Elizabeth Gitter) is a teenager that has been orphaned after her father dies of Leukemia.  Her mother died from drowning when Jordan was five years old. She's sent to live with an aunt (Tara Westwood), who is the identical twin of her mother, and uncle (Steve Bacic). They live in the town of Silver Falls, where she learns of ghost stories after seeing a burning mannequin at a park where teens go to party. When police come to raid the party, Jordan wanders the surrounding forest and discovers the ring, which she places on her forefinger without even thinking.

When she returns home, she tries to remove the ring, but it won't come off. The ring, it turns out, attracts the ghost of the girl who had mysteriously been murdered twenty years before. No one, however, knows of the murder.

The ghost does mischievous acts around the house, such as moving pictures, opening doors, and stealing small items from Jordan's aunt and uncle. These actions cause concern in her household, causing them to make an appointment for Jordan with the local psychologist, who is not fond of Jordan, as he believes she is a negative influence on his geek son. After Jordan meets with Dr. Parish, she confesses to Larry that she sees one of the dead twins.

Cast 

Alix Elizabeth Gitter as Jordan
Erick Avari as Dr. Parrish
Steve Bacic as Kevin Sanders
James C. Burns as Wyatt Dahl
James Cavlo as Larry
Tadhg Kelly as Robbie
James Ralph as Sheriff O'Leary
Jade Ramsey as Heather Dahl
Nikita Ramsey as Holly Dahl
Tara Westwood as Anne Sanders

Reception 

NOW Toronto gave a mostly negative review for A Haunting at Silver Falls, writing that it "isn't wildly scary, but its slightly unusual take on the ghost story gives it a memorable creepiness." DVD Verdict and JoBlo.com both gave mixed reviews, as both felt that while it wasn't a particularly good film it did have some merits and would appeal to some viewers.

Sequel 
In June 2019 a sequel to the 2013 film entitled A Haunting at Silver Falls: The Return was released to DVD, On Demand, and digital. Several actors returned to reprise their roles from the first film such as Jade and Nikita Ramsey, however Alix Elizabeth Gitter did not return to the film and the role of Jordan was played by Laura Flannery. The film's story features Jordan returning to Silver Spring to deal with the ghost of her aunt Anne, who has combined forces with a convict in order to seek revenge.

References

External links 

2013 films
2013 horror films
American ghost films
Films shot in Oregon
Films set in Oregon
2010s English-language films
2010s American films